Brandywine Creek is a stream in Shelby, Hancock and Franklin counties, Indiana, in the United States. It is a tributary of Big Blue River.

Brandywine Creek was so named from the fact pioneers shared a bottle of peach brandy while camped there.

See also
List of rivers of Indiana

References

Rivers of Franklin County, Indiana
Rivers of Hancock County, Indiana
Rivers of Shelby County, Indiana
Rivers of Indiana